The Universidad Católica de la Santísima Concepción sometimes translated as "Catholic University of the Most Holy Conception", is a university in Chile. It is part of the Chilean Traditional Universities.

The University

The Universidad Católica de la Santísima Concepción was founded on July 10, 1991, by ordinance of the Bishop of the Archdiocese of the Santísima Concepción, Monsignor Antonio Moreno Casamitjana. The regional branch campus of the Pontificia Universidad Católica de Chile in Talcahuano, created in 1970, provided the foundation for the new university.

The university is a private entity, receiving some state support.  Legally autonomous, it is a member of the Council of Rectors of Chilean Universities.  This is a network of so-called traditional universities, in other words, those working within the main scientific and intellectual frameworks of the country.  Furthermore, the university is a member of the Chilean Chapter of Catholic Universities and the International Federation of Catholic Universities (FIUC).  The university maintains close ties with the Archbishop of Concepción, whose happens to be the university's Chancellor, its highest authority, with all of the attributes established within the university statutes.

At present, the Universidad Católica de la Santísima Concepción consists of seven faculties (Law, Science, Education, Engineering, Medicine, Business Management, and Communications, History and Social Sciences) an Institute of Theology, and a Technological Institute.  They provide undergraduate and graduate-level courses, which are complemented by considerable research and sustained academic extension.

Although the university is also active in the cities of Chillán, Los Angeles, and Cañete, both its main campus and its main offices are located in the city of Concepción.

Notable alumni
 Frank Sauerbaum, ex deputy.
 Gonzalo Osses, poet and writer.
 Alejandro Navarro, politician, current senator.
 Marcelo Chávez, current deputy.

References

External links

Official Web Site 

Catholic universities and colleges in Chile
Educational institutions established in 1991
Universities in Biobío Region
Concepción, Chile
1991 establishments in Chile